A cruiser submarine was a very large submarine designed to remain at sea for extended periods in areas distant from base facilities. Their role was analogous to surface cruisers, cruising distant waters, commerce raiding, and scouting for the battle fleet. Cruiser submarines were successful for a brief period of World War I, but were less successful than smaller submarines during World War II. Large submarines remained vulnerable to damage from defensively equipped merchant ships (DEMS), were slow to dive if found by aircraft, offered a large sonar echo surface, and were less able to defensively maneuver during depth charge attacks.

History
The cruiser submarine concept originated during the unrestricted submarine warfare campaign of 1917. Three German Type U 139 submarines and seven former merchant submarines, each armed with two  guns, patrolled areas distant from their North Sea bases to sink Allied merchant shipping as part of an effort to end World War I by starving the United Kingdom of Great Britain and Ireland. These distant patrols enjoyed unique immunity to the defensive convoy measures which limited successful submarine attacks in the vicinity of the British Isles.

The First World War combat experience of these submarines encouraged all major navies to build submarine cruiser prototypes between the world wars, but their cost discouraged most from further production. Developments were further limited by the London Naval Treaty of 1930, under which each signatory was permitted to possess no more than three large submarines, each above 2,000 tons (2,032 metric tons) but not exceeding 2,800 tons (2,845 metric tons) standard displacement, with guns not exceeding 6.1 in (150 mm) in caliber.

Japanese focus on the distances of their Pacific trade routes encouraged development of the widest variety of submarine cruisers, including the A, B and J types. Germany decided against building projected 3,140-ton type XI U-boats with an aircraft hangar and four  guns. Long-range submarines with less impressive deck guns, including Type IXD2 U-boats and United States Navy fleet submarines, evolved through the Second World War; and may be identified as cruiser submarines in comparison to submarines designed for shorter patrols over lesser distances.

Examples

Notes

Sources
 
 
 
 
 
 
 
 
 
 
 

Submarines by type